The Clown is a lost 1916 American silent drama film starring stage star Victor Moore and directed by William C. deMille. It was produced by Jesse Lasky and distributed by Paramount Pictures.

Plot summary

Cast
 Victor Moore as Piffle
 Thomas Meighan as Dick Ordway
 Ernest Joy as Judge Jonathan Le Roy
 Florence Dagmar as Millicent, His Daughter
 Gerald Ward as Jackie, His Son
 Tom Forman as Bob Hunter
 Horace B. Carpenter as Circus Manager
 Wallace Pyke as Rollo
 Billy Jacobs as Jonathan Le Roy Fox

References

External links
 
 
 
 

1916 films
American silent feature films
Lost American films
1916 drama films
Silent American drama films
American black-and-white films
Films about clowns
Films directed by William C. deMille
1916 lost films
Lost drama films
1910s American films